Henri Jacquet (born 1888, year of death unknown) was a Swiss épée fencer. He competed at the 1920, 1924 and 1928 Summer Olympics.

References

External links
 

1888 births
Year of death missing
Swiss male épée fencers
Olympic fencers of Switzerland
Fencers at the 1920 Summer Olympics
Fencers at the 1924 Summer Olympics
Fencers at the 1928 Summer Olympics